Alastair Smales was born on 8 May 1962, in Australia. He lost the use of his legs in 1992 becoming a paraplegic after a four-wheel drive he was fixing slipped off a jack and fell on him. Due to this injury, Smales is now classified a S6 wheelchair grade in swimming competitions.

Smales has represented Australia in three consecutive Paralympics in swimming, held a world record at the IPC Swimming World Championships Mar de Plata in 2002 and ranked 1 in his classification. Smales swimming career started in 1996 and ended in 2004 due to his age and inability to keep up with the other swimmers. He was a member of the Sporting Wheelies and Disabled Association and trained at the Redcliffe Leagues Lawnton Club.

After retiring from swimming, Smales pursued a career in air traffic control.

Personal

Alastair Smales was born in Australia on 8 May 1962.  
He currently lives in Redcliffe, Queensland with his wife Wanda, and works as an air traffic controller. They have two children.
 
Smales started his swimming career when he was at the age of 42, which is more than twice the average age of the rest of the Australian swimming team. Since competing at the Atlanta and Sydney Paralympics Smales has ranked number one in the world and has also held a 50m butterfly world record. Despite Smales’ age he was able to make an impact on Paralympic swimming and hopefully influencing other aspiring athletes.

Smales ended up retiring from swimming after eight years due to his inability to handle travelling overseas. He would spend months in hospital after travelling overseas and decided for his health it would be best to retire. Also, due to his age Smales wouldn't have been able to keep up for much longer compared to the younger athletes he was competing with, "It gets harder and harder as you get older," (Age No Barrier in Pool Quest, 2004).

Smales was a role model to the rest of the swimming team and helped the younger swimmers deal with the excitement and stress of their first games. They would all continue and have longer careers than him due to their age and extra stamina due to it. Smales achieved so much in his short career and even with his age was able to rank so high in the world.

Disability

Alastair Smales’ injury resulted in him being paraplegic which is when either both legs or hips and organs are paralysed. It is the “impairment or loss of motor and/or sensory function in the thoracic lumbar or sacral segments of the spinal cord, secondary to damage of neural elements within the spinal canal” (Nas, 2015). This is a possible result of damage to the spinal cord when the four-wheel drive fell onto Smales’. Spinal cord damage is the most common cause of paraplegia and has no cure, but the individual may recover partial muscle control.

Types of Paraplegia

Incomplete or Partial Paraplegia (Paraparesis) 
This is when paraplegia does not fully effect both legs, where it may be only one legs that's fully paralysed and the other has limited or normal function. This may develop though rehabilitation therapy for paraplegia where they develop into a case of partial paraplegia through extensive work. “Or, a degenerative condition that causes a case of incomplete paraplegia to come a complete paraplegia as symptoms progress” (SpinalCord.com, 2020).

Complete Paraplegia 
This is when the individual has no feeling or function in their legs. Resulting in the inability to use both legs and sometimes may experience other issues like loss of bladder/bowel control.

These symptoms are common with spinal cord injuries in the thoracic and lumbar regions of the spine, which is the same as Smales’ injury.

Causes of Paraplegia 
Majority of paraplegics start off with perfectly healthy legs. It is the brain or spinal cord that will lead to paraplegia because it sends signals down into the body, relaying signals from the body to the brain. Therefore, when the brain or spinal cord loses its ability to work properly these signals weaken and become non-existent. The leading cause of spinal cord injuries is car and motorcycle accidents which are 38.3% of all paraplegic cases which links closely to Smales’ case.

Even with this disability Smales decided to pursue a career in swimming. Smales swims in the s6 (wheelchair) grade in competition. This grade includes “swimmers with short stature or amputation of both arms, or moderate co-ordination problems on one side of their body” (“World Para Swimming Classification & Categories - SB9, SM8,” 2020).

Swimming
Smales’ started his swimming career in 1996 and ended it in 2004. During these years he competed disability swimming became more mainstream which resulted in more opportunities for disabled people to participate in competitive swimming in Australia. This is because over time society developed a policy to change the Australian society to be more accepting and inclusive.

Paralympic swimming races are organised according to a functional classification system. A class system is used to help determine paralympic swimmer's categorisation based on their scores on muscle testing, range of motion tests, co-ordination and/or level of amputation. This ensures that all swimmers are equal when racing and that winning is determined by sporting factors such as “skill, fitness, power, endurance, tactical ability and mental focus” (World Para Swimming Classification & Categories - SB9, SM8, 2020). Minimising the impact an athlete's impairment has on their performance so their sporting excellence is what determines the athlete's or team's victory.

Training 
Smales’ has no training program listed anywhere, but each training program must take into account each swimmers different health conditions. Each swimmer's training load is there to ensure athletes develop short- and long-term adaptive responses which lead to performance improvement.

Races 
According to the International Paralympic Committee these are the games/championships that Alastair Smales swam during his Paralympic swimming career.

Atlanta Paralympic Games 

The Atlanta Paralympics was held in Georgia, United States from 16 to 25 August. The host USA won the most medals with 46 gold medals and Australia came second with a total of 42 gold medals. The Atlanta games showcased 19 different sporting events, one of them being paralympic swimming.

Smales’ first games was the Atlanta 1996 Paralympic games.

Sydney Paralympic Games

The Sydney Paralympics was held in Australia from 18 to 29 October. This Paralympics game was held in an era when the Paralympics movement was growing and more visible so it was more mainstreamed and popular. There was 3,879 Paralympians from 123 different countries. The Sydney games showcased 18 different sporting events, one less than the previous Paralympic games. “Australia dominated the Sydney Paralympics, winning most golds (63) and overall medals (149)” (Phillips & Naar, 2020). The Sydney Paralympic Organising Committee (SPOC) decided to use the same venues as the Olympic Games which led to a more seamless Paralympic event that had the same quality of presentation as the Olympics. The organisers also introduced a $15 day pass to attract big crowds to the Paralympic events which resulted in 1.16 million spectators. To increase awareness and support for the games SPOC also implemented a Paralympic national education program and delivered it to schools around Australia. “This increased awareness about the Paralympics in schools resulted in 340, 000 school kids from every state and territory” (Phillips & Naar, 2020).

His second games was the Sydney 2000 Paralympic games in Australia. This year Smales’ swam in three different races.

IPC Swimming World Championships Mar de Plata 

The IPC Swimming Championships was held from 3 to 12 December. This championship is believed to have marginalised the disabled by not abiding by the classification systems developed by the International Organisations of Sport for the Disabled. The IPCs though were the first international partner of the local Paralympic Games in 1992. Resulting in IPC becoming a strong influence on the organisation of the Paralympic Games. “Before the establishment of the IPC, sport for the disabled was organised internationally by a number of sporting federations” (Howe & Jones, 2006). The IPC has an integrated functional swimming classification which has 10 classes instead of 31 which reduces the cancellation of events and number of races swimmers in several classes take part in.

His first championships was the IPC Swimming World Championships Mar de Plata 2002 in Argentina. He swam in a total of three races.

Athens 2004 Paralympic Games 
The Athens Paralympics was held in Greece from 17 to 28 September. The total of 19 sporting events made up the Athens Games. “China dominated the medal tally and gold medal standings. Great Britain finished with the second highest amount of gold medal and Australia had the second highest medal tally overall (“Athens 2004,” 2020). More than 140 countries were represented at the games which was the largest representation in the history of the event.

Smales’ third and final games were the Athens 2004 Paralympic games in Greece. He swam in a total of three races throughout the games.

Work
After Alastair Smales’ retired from swimming he went and pursued a career in air traffic control. He is now an air traffic controller, which is a person who “coordinates the movement of an aircraft to maintain safe distances between them” (Air Traffic Controllers : Occupational Outlook Handbook: : U.S. Bureau of Labor Statistics, 2021). Smales’ would’ve had to either complete a diploma of Aviation with Air services in Australia or alternatively complete training with the Royal Australian Air Force, which will require you to have completed year 12 or enrolment as an existing officer. (Air Traffic Controller, 2019)

Diploma of Aviation with Air Service 
This diploma enables individuals to get roles in flight crew or emergency commercial pilot duties. Their duties include “technical and non-technical aviation skills and knowledge to a wide range of air transport operations, including passenger, charter and cargo operations” (“Diploma of Aviation (Commercial Pilot Licence - Aeroplane),” 2022). This qualification fulfils some of the requirements necessary for a certification as a commercial pilot by the Civil Aviation Safety Authority.

Royal Australian Air Force 

The Australian Air Force is mainly for individuals who are preparing to become recruits to enlist for military service. The training involves the “transformation of civilians into aviators who have basic military knowledge to become members of the Air Force team” (Australian Air Force, 2017). This recruitment training runs over a period of 10.6 weeks. The training is about delivering members to the Air Force who have perfected basic military skills and knowledge. 
Air Traffic controllers in Australia who work through the company airservices work in one of the two major centres in Melbourne or Brisbane. “There are two terminal control units or 28 control towers at international and regional airports across Australia” (“Air Traffic Control Careers,” 2022). 
The medium wage for an air traffic controller is $130 420 in May 2020.

References

External links 
 Swimming Queensland
 Alastair Smales personal bests, Swimming Western Australia
 Paralympic Games, Australian Institute of Sport

1962 births
Living people
Male Paralympic swimmers of Australia
Swimmers at the 1996 Summer Paralympics
Swimmers at the 2000 Summer Paralympics
Swimmers at the 2004 Summer Paralympics
Australian male freestyle swimmers
Australian male butterfly swimmers
Medalists at the World Para Swimming Championships
S6-classified Paralympic swimmers